Gravisauria is a clade of sauropod dinosaurs consisting of some genera, Vulcanodontidae and Eusauropoda.

Classification
The clade Gravisauria was appointed by the French paleontologist Ronan Allain and Moroccan paleontologist Najat Aquesbi in 2008 when a cladistic analysis of the dinosaur found by Allain, Tazoudasaurus, as the outcome was that the family Vulcanodontidae. The group includes Tazoudasaurus and Vulcanodon, and the sister taxon Eusauropoda, but also certain species such as Antetonitrus, Gongxianosaurus and Isanosaurus that do not belong in Vulcanodontidae but to an even more basic position occupied in Sauropoda. It made sense to have Sauropoda compared to this, more derived group that included Vulcanodontidae and Eusauropoda in a definition: Gravisauria (heavy lizards), defined as the group formed by the last common ancestor of Tazoudasaurus and Saltasaurus (Bonaparte and Powell, 1980) and all its descendants.

Below is a cladogram found by Nair and Salisbury in 2012 showing the relationships of Gravisauria:

Synapomorphies
Aquesbi mentioned two synapomorphies, shared derived characteristics of Gravisauria: the vertebrae are wider side to side than front to rear and possession of asymmetrical condyles femoris at the bottom of the femur. Those were previously not thought to be Eusauropoda synapomorphies but Allian found these properties also on Tazoudasaurus.

Involvement in extinction

Gravisauria split off in the Early Jurassic, around the Pliensbachian and Toarcian, 183 million years ago, and Aquesbi thought that this was part of a much larger revolution in the fauna, which includes the disappearance of Prosauropoda, Coelophysoidea and basal Thyreophora, which they attributed to a worldwide mass extinction.

References

Najat Aquesbi, 2008, Les Sites de Dinosaures du Lias du Haut Atlas (Maroc), Problèmes de Phylogénie et de Paleogeographie

 
Sauropods